9News may refer to the following:

 CNN Philippines News and Current Affairs, formerly known as Solar News and 9News
 9TV, branded as Solar News Channel, its defunct news channel
 KUSA (TV), Denver, Colorado, USA, branded as 9 News
 Nine News, Australia, branded as 9News